Marcel Paeschen (30 April 1937 – 21 March 2002) was a Belgian footballer. He played in 16 matches for the Belgium national football team from 1957 to 1964.

References

1937 births
2002 deaths
Belgian footballers
Belgium international footballers
Place of birth missing
Association footballers not categorized by position